Events from the year 1828 in Germany

Incumbents

Kingdoms 
 Kingdom of Prussia
 Monarch – Frederick William III of Prussia (16 November 1797 – 7 June 1840)
 Kingdom of Bavaria
 Monarch - Ludwig I (1825–1848)
 Kingdom of Saxony
 Anthony (5 May 1827 – 6 June 1836)
 Kingdom of Hanover
 George IV  (29 January 1820 – 26 June 1830)
 Kingdom of Württemberg
 William (30 October 1816 – 25 June 1864)

Grand Duchies 
 Grand Duke of Baden
 Louis I (8 December 1818 – 30 March 1830) 
 Grand Duke of Hesse
 Louis I (14 August 1806 – 6 April 1830)
 Grand Duke of Mecklenburg-Schwerin
 Frederick Francis I– (24 April 1785 – 1 February 1837)
 Grand Duke of Mecklenburg-Strelitz
 George (6 November 1816 – 6 September 1860)
 Grand Duke of Oldenburg
 Peter I (2 July 1823 - 21 May 1829)
 Grand Duke of Saxe-Weimar-Eisenach
 Charles Frederick (14 June 1828 - 8 July 1853)

Principalities 
 Schaumburg-Lippe
 George William (13 February 1787 - 1860)
 Schwarzburg-Rudolstadt
 Friedrich Günther (28 April 1807 - 28 June 1867)
 Schwarzburg-Sondershausen
 Günther Friedrich Karl I (14 October 1794 - 19 August 1835)
 Principality of Lippe
 Leopold II (5 November 1802 - 1 January 1851)
 Principality of Reuss-Greiz
 Heinrich XIX (29 January 1817 - 31 October 1836)
 Waldeck and Pyrmont
 George II (9 September 1813 - 15 May 1845)

Duchies 
 Duke of Anhalt-Dessau
 Leopold IV (9 August 1817 - 22 May 1871)
 Duke of Brunswick
 Charles II (16 June 1815 – 9 September 1830)
 Duke of Saxe-Altenburg
 Duke of Saxe-Hildburghausen (1780–1826) and Duke of Saxe-Altenburg (1826–1834) - Frederick
 Duke of Saxe-Meiningen
 Bernhard II (24 December 1803–20 September 1866)

Events 
 26 May – Supposed feral child Kaspar Hauser is discovered in Nuremberg, Germany.

Births 
 17 April – Johanna Mestorf, German prehistoric archaeologist (d. 1909)
 24 November – Henry Lomb, German-American optician, co-founder of Bausch & Lomb (d. 1908)

Deaths 
 9 July- Cathinka Buchwieser, German operatic singer and actress (b. 1789)
 26 October – Albrecht Thaer, German agronomist (b. 1752)
 5 November – Maria Feodorovna (Sophie Dorothea of Württemberg), Empress of Paul I of Russia (b. 1759)
 15 November – Amalie of Zweibrücken-Birkenfeld, First Queen of Saxony/Duchess of Warsaw (b. 1752)

References

Years of the 19th century in Germany
Germany
Germany
1828 in Germany